Disney Princess: My Fairytale Adventure is a video game released for the Wii, Nintendo 3DS, and PC. Part of the Disney Princess franchise, the game was published by Disney Interactive Studios on September 14, 2012, in North America, and three days later in Europe.

Synopsis 
Become immersed in the world of your favorite Disney Princesses like you've always dreamed of with Disney Princess: My Fairytale Adventure. Become the Fairy Godmother's apprentice and use your magic wand to put a stop to the spell that's been cast over the kingdoms. Meet and interact with Belle, Tiana, Cinderella, Rapunzel and Ariel in their own worlds, and explore iconic locations, like Beast's castle, Rapunzel's tower and Cinderella's ball on your adventure. Encounter beloved Disney characters, such as Lumiere, Pascal, Flounder, Gus and more. Personalize your character and room in the Fairy Godmother's castle in a variety of different ways. Complete quests and earn gems as you progress throughout the game then exchange them for special items. Expand your enchanted fun by playing fun-filled mini games. It's time to make your own happily ever after.Key features

Key features 

 Earn gems while you play and exchange them for special items.
 Play a variety of fun-filled mini games to expand your enchanted fun.
 Wish upon a star and immerse yourself in the enchanted worlds of some of your favorite Disney princesses, including Cinderella, Belle, Tiana, Rapunzel and Ariel.
 Become the Fairy Godmother's apprentice and explore each Princess' world along with memorable locations like Beast's castle, Rapunzel's tower and Cinderella's ball.
 Use your magic wand to help break the spell that's been cast over the kingdoms.
 Meet and interact with familiar Disney characters, such as Lumiere, Flounder, Gus, Pascal and others who'll help you throughout the game.
 Customize your room in the Fairy Godmother's castle and personalize your character with gorgeous outfits, stylish accessories and more.

Reception 
CanadianOnlineGamers gave the game a score of 83/100: "As far as Disney games on the 3DS are concerned, Disney Princess: My Fairytale Adventure ranks among the better ones out there. The visuals are vibrant and the varied gameplay will keep all those aspiring Princesses busy for hours on end. While the gameplay does tend to get tedious at times, the reality is that the games target audience, girls anywhere from 5-10, will definitely enjoy the game provided of course they adore those Disney Princess characters". Common Sense Media game the game 4/5 stars for "Quality", writing: "Parents need to know that Disney Princess: My Fairytale Adventure is a non-violent adventure game in which kids take on the role of a customizable fairy godmother-in-training. Its simple themes of friendship and doing your duty are safe for kids, and its intuitive controls and elementary activities are suitable for kids as young as four or five years old. The only potential concern is that the game features plenty of commercial Disney characters and goes a little heavy on princessy glamor".

GamingXP gave the game an 82/100: "The game is perfectly designed for children and has a good mix of Disney flair, difficulty and gameplay. In addition to that, it looks good  especially the 3D effect, and a fully localized language edition. Disney Princess: My Fairytale Adventure also comes up with collectibles, thus a more in depth experience is produced. Too bad that the playing time is a little too short, otherwise an even higher rating would have been easily possible". Nintendo Life gave the game a rating of 2 stars out of 10: "Crawling with glitches, slowdown, repetitive gameplay, disinterested voice actors and stiff controls, Disney Princess: My Fairytale Adventure is less a game than it is a mess of unfinished code. Young gamers will likely get a kick out of interacting with their favourite characters, but it's a magic that fizzles all too soon when the adventure is this uninspired. There are many opportunities to customise small aspects of the game, such as your character's appearance and a bedroom you can decorate, but it's simply not worth the effort. This is one Princess that's quite simply not worth rescuing".

Characters & Their Chests

References

External links

Disney Princess: My Fairytale Adventure at Steam

2012 video games
Disney Princess
Disney video games
Nintendo 3DS games
Video games developed in the United States
Video games featuring female protagonists
Wii games
Windows games